2nd Lithuanian National Cavalry Brigade was one of the Lithuanian national cavalry brigades.

References 

Military units and formations established in 1776
Lithuanian National Cavalry Brigades